Mayfield Park is a suburb of Johannesburg, South Africa. It is located in Region 9.
The area code is 2091. It is home to South Downs Country Club [18 hole golf course] and the Klipriviersberg Nature Reserve. The Klip Rivier [stone river] runs through it and there is a recreation centre at the entrance to the nature reserve.

References

Johannesburg Region F